The Aragó Tunnel is a railway tunnel in the Spanish city of Barcelona. Built in the 1970s, it replaced the previously existing railway that ran in a cutting through the city centre.

Services
The tunnel is served by Rodalies de Catalunya services R2, R2 Nord and R2 Sud and regional lines R11, R13, R14, R15 and R16.

Stations
Barcelona Sants
Passeig de Gràcia
El Clot-Aragó

See also
Meridiana Tunnel

References

Rail transport in Barcelona
Underground commuter rail